Cummings Island is an uninhabited island in the Rideau River in the city of Ottawa in Canada and the site of a former settlement.

History
The island's first settler was Charles Cummings, who built there his house in 1840 and operated a ferry across the Rideau River until a simple wooden bridge was built a few years later. Charles Cummings died in 1847 and was buried on the island.

In 1864, Robert Cummings, son of Charles, bought the island from the government for $4 and built a store (with post office), flour mill and carriage factory there. During this period the island thrived as a commercial hub between Bytown and Janeville (later Eastview, and still later Vanier), even having the first telephone in what was then Gloucester Township.

In 1891, the old wooden bridge was replaced by a new steel bridge, which was originally named Bingham's Bridge, after Ottawa mayor Samuel Bingham, but this name never caught on.

In 1922, the city of Ottawa bought the island from Cummings' sons for $30,000, and all the buildings were demolished. Since 1923, the island has been uninhabited. A stone abutment is the only structure that remains on the island, it was built to protect the island from erosion in the spring, when the river thaws and sends ice crashing into it.

Other islands
Another island with the same name is located in Little Sand Lake in Kenora District, Ontario.

References

River islands of Ontario
Landforms of Ottawa